Creatures of the Street is the second album by the glam rock artist Jobriath. It was released in 1974 on Elektra Records. The album was compiled from the sessions for its predecessor. Highlights include the jaunty "Ooh La La", the almost folky "Scumbag", the orchestral "Dietrich/Fondyke" and "Movie Queen" from the previous album were originally intended to be one track.

Among the listed guest stars for the album is "Chris Peterson (Courtesy of Stormy Forest Records)". This is a misspelled name for Kris Peterson, the same vocalist that appears on the Frank Zappa album Waka/Jawaka.

"Scumbag" mentions the Zum Zum restaurant chain, and in turn inspired the reference to "Zom Zom's" in the Gary Numan song "Down in the Park."

Track listing
All tracks composed by Jobriath.

References

1974 albums
Jobriath albums
Albums produced by Eddie Kramer
Elektra Records albums